Optics & Photonics News is the membership magazine of The Optical Society. It is published monthly (with a double issue in July/August) and covers developments in optics, photonics, and related topics in physics and engineering. It was established in 1975 as Optics News. The magazine adopted a regular bimonthly publication schedule beginning in 1982 and transitioned to monthly publication in 1985. The name of the publication was changed to Optics & Photonics News in January 1990, in light of the dramatic growth of photonics as a new discipline in the wake of the discovery of the laser. The format of the magazine has evolved from a newsletter format to a glossy magazine.

Since 1982, the last issue of each year has included a "year in optics" feature, including summaries of some of the most notable work in optics and photonic science and engineering over the previous 12 months.

References

External links

Professional and trade magazines
Optica (society)
Monthly magazines published in the United States
Magazines established in 1975
English-language magazines
Science and technology magazines published in the United States
Magazines published in Washington, D.C.